The 1968 Bowling Green Falcons football team was an American football team that represented Bowling Green State University in the Mid-American Conference (MAC) during the 1968 NCAA University Division football season. In their first season under head coach Don Nehlen, the Falcons compiled a 6–3–1 record (3–2–1 against MAC opponents), finished in third place in the MAC, and outscored opponents by a combined total of 267 to 147.

The team's statistical leaders included P.J. Nyitray with 898 passing yards, Fred Mathews with 733 rushing yards, and Eddie Jones with 716 receiving yards.

Schedule

References

Bowling Green
Bowling Green Falcons football seasons
Bowling Green Falcons football